John Leonard Hines (May 21, 1868 – October 13, 1968) was an American general who served as Chief of Staff of the United States Army from 1924 to 1926.

Early career
Born in White Sulphur Springs, West Virginia, to Irish parents, Edward and Mary, Hines graduated from the United States Military Academy at West Point, New York and was commissioned as a second lieutenant of Infantry on June 12, 1891. His first assignment was to the 2nd Infantry Regiment. Hines served with the regiment in Nebraska and Montana from 1891 to 1898, where he married Harriet Schofield "Rita" Wherry, one of the daughters of Brigadier General William M. Wherry and Alice Grammer.

Hines served in Cuba during the Spanish–American War and in the Philippines during the Philippine–American War. In 1898 he was elected as a Veteran Companion of the Pennsylvania Commandery of the Military Order of Foreign Wars. He was adjutant of the Mexican Punitive Expedition in 1916–17 under General John J. Pershing.

World War I

During World War I, Hines rose rapidly in rank as he was promoted from major to lieutenant colonel in May 1917, then to colonel (November 1917), brigadier general (April 1918), and, in August 1918, to temporary major general—four grades in 16 months. He assumed successively larger commands—from regiment to brigade, division, and finally, corps.

Hines commanded the 1st Brigade, 1st Division, from May to August 1918, during which time he received the Distinguished Service Cross, the second-highest decoration for valor in the United States Army, with the medal's citation reading:

On August 16, 1918, Hines assumed command of the 4th Division. He commanded the division during the American operations at St. Mihiel and in the Meuse-Argonne until October 11, 1918. Hines then took command of III Corps, leading it during the final engagements of the war and the  occupation of the Rhineland. For his service during the war he was awarded the Army Distinguished Service Medal, the citation for which reads:

Post war
Hines was promoted to permanent major general in March 1921. His post-war commands included the 5th Division, the 2nd Division and the VIII Corps Area.

In December 1922, Hines was assigned as Deputy Chief of Staff of the Army, and became Chief of Staff of the United States Army on September 14, 1924. His army biography states that as chief of staff, he "stressed the need for balance in funding and personnel for all parts of the permanent establishment, pointed up the effects of strength deficiencies upon Army capability to meet the provisions of the National Defense Act of 1920, and urged action on housing and promotions to promote personnel retention."

On May 7, 1925 Hines dedicated the landing field at the Vancouver Barracks in Vancouver, Washington, to the memory of Lieutenant Alexander Pearson Jr., who was killed on September 2, 1924 in Fairfield, Ohio while flying the Curtiss R-8 in preparation for the upcoming Pulitzer Trophy Race.

In 1926, after completing his tour as Army Chief of Staff, Hines took command of the IX Corps Area in California, which he led until 1930. In 1930, Hines became commanding general of the Philippine Department.

Retirement
Hines retired in May 1932. He was promoted to the rank of full (4 star) general on the retired list by a Special Act of Congress on June 15, 1940.

Hines died in Washington, D.C., at Walter Reed Army Medical Center at age 100. He is buried at Arlington National Cemetery. , Hines is one of only two American generals to have celebrated their 100th birthdays, the other being James Van Fleet.

Family and legacy
On May 5, 2000, the United States Postal Service issued the Distinguished Soldiers stamps in which Hines was honored.

Hines' son, Colonel John L. Hines Jr. (1905–1986), served in World War II with the 6th Armored Division, commanding the division's Combat Command A from November 1944 to March 1945. He was twice decorated with the Distinguished Service Cross and was severely wounded outside Frankfurt, Germany when an 88 mm antitank shell grazed his face.

Dates of rank
Note that the date indicated is the date of rank. In some cases, the promotion was accepted at a later date.

Awards and decorations
  Distinguished Service Cross
  Distinguished Service Medal
  Silver Star
  Spanish Campaign Medal
  Army of Cuban Occupation Medal
  Philippine Campaign Medal
  Mexican Service Medal
  World War I Victory Medal
  Army of Occupation of Germany Medal
  Knight Commander of the Order of St Michael and St George (UK)
  Commandeur Légion d'honneur (France)
  Croix de guerre (France)
  Commander Order of Léopold (Belgium)
  Order of the Crown (Italy)
  Medal of Solidarity, 1918 (Panama)

References

Bibliography

External links

United States Army Infantry Branch personnel
United States Army Chiefs of Staff
American people of Irish descent
American military personnel of the Spanish–American War
American military personnel of the Philippine–American War
United States Army generals of World War I
United States Army generals
United States Military Academy alumni
Recipients of the Distinguished Service Cross (United States)
Recipients of the Distinguished Service Medal (US Army)
Honorary Knights Commander of the Order of St Michael and St George
Recipients of the Croix de Guerre 1914–1918 (France)
Commandeurs of the Légion d'honneur
Burials at Arlington National Cemetery
American centenarians
Men centenarians
1868 births
1968 deaths
People from White Sulphur Springs, West Virginia
Military personnel from West Virginia